Dong Open Air is a heavy metal music festival held annually in Neukirchen-Vluyn, Germany since 2001.

Lineups

2001
August 17–18: Blood Red Angel, Decapitation, Fianna, Guerrilla, Heartwork, Impure, N.R.G., Stripped Of Flesh, Yppah Nomed.

2002
July 19–20: Adorned Brood, Amityville, Blood Red Angel, Complex 7, Guerrilla, Fianna, Hate Factor, Mabus, N.R.G., Sarx, Schattenleben, Sencirow, Torture Chamber, Violet.

2003
July 18–19: Abaddon, Adorned Brood, Antifreeze, Burden of Grief, Folkedudl, Hate Factor, Night in Gales, Osyris, Psychotron, Ratsbane, Skyclad, Sun of Sadness, Violet, Witchtower.

2004
July 16–17: Chainheart, Crikey, Dark Suns, Disillusion, Equilibrium, Final Breath, Humanity, Insignium, Jack Slater, Jester's Funeral, Lanfear, My Darkest Hate, Seraphim, Suidakra, The Rules, Tomorrow's Eve, Vintersorg.

2005
July 15–16: Aardvarks, Behind the Scenery, Delirious, Desilence, Drawline, Elvenking, Excrementory Grindfuckers, Finntroll, Hate Factor, Intense, Mindcrime, Orkus, Perzonal War, President Evil, Ravage, Skyclad, Stormgarde, Sycronomica, Synasthasia, XIV Dark Centuries.

2006
July 14–15: Die Apokalyptischen Reiter, Commander, Contradiction, Dragonland, Grailknights, Guerrilla, Gun Barrel, Hidden In The Fog, Horrorscope, Lords Of Decadence, Motorjesus, Mystic Prophecy, Negator, Osyris, Rotting Christ, Savage Circus, Symbiontic, The Bonny Situation, Turisas.

2007
July 13–14: Absence, All We Hate, Black Messiah, Chainsaw, Cheeno, Dark Age, Darzamat, Debauchery, Eluveitie, Ensiferum, Galskap, Novembers Fall, Månegarm, Orphaned Land, Runamok, Sinister, Skyclad, Synasthasia, The Pokes, van Canto, Verdict.

2008
July 18–19: Civilization One, Commander, Dark Tranquillity, Drone, Grailknights, Grind Inc., Lyriel, Masterstroke, Moder, Morgana Lefay, Nohellia, Path of Golconda, Persefone, Raintime, Rocketchief, Sabaton, Sadist, Scarlet Fire, Sheephead, Suidakra, Torian

Primordial were supposed to play but cancelled, and Suidakra were the last-minute replacement.

2009
July 17–18: 7 Seals, Amorphis, Cast in Silence, Cheeno, Clanrock, Common Grave, Dornenreich, Elexorien, Failed Perfection, Hatred, In December, Interrobäng, Kingdom of Salvation, Orphan Hate, Rage, Sheephead, Skyclad, Splatter and Gore Department, Sycronomica, The Very End

Dew-Scented were supposed to be one of the headliners but cancelled due to sickness.

2010
July 23–24: Adorned Brood, All We Hate, Blood Red Angel, Dark Tranquillity, Debauchery, Die Apokalyptischen Reiter, Excrementory Grindfuckers, Folkedud/Chainheart, Grailknights, Gun Barrel, Hate Factor, Insignium, Jack Slater, Motorjesus, Orphan Hate, Persefone, Raintime, Rotting Christ, Skyclad, Synasthasia, Van Canto

2011
July 14–16: Artas, Balfor, Bloodwork, Canopy, Contradiction, Crosshead, Dew-Scented, Evile, Hackneyed, Harasai, Hatesphere, Iced Earth, Ichor, Motorjesus, Orden Ogan, Overkill, Past M.D., Ranz Böllner & die Heavy Metal Warriors, Red Circuit, Shellycoat, Shraphead, Symbolic, The Rotted, Virgin Snatch, Vogelfrey, Vulture Industries

2012
July 12–14: Aardvarks, Armored Saint, Basanos, Betontod, Black Blitz, Burden Of Grief, Circle of Silence, Collapse, Cyrcus, Davidian, Drone, Eastern Front, HungÖver, Knorkator, Napalm Death, Night In Gales, Omnicide, One Bullet Left, Path of Golconda, Pictura, Rage, Revolving Door, Sepultura, Soldiers Of Rock, Suidakra, The Very End

2013
July 11–13: Act of Worship, Acyl, Aeons Confer, Any Given Day, Born From Pain, Crossplane, Dark Tranquillity, Elvenpath, Exotoxis, Finntroll, Fyrnreich, Godslave, Hatred, In Arkadia, J.T. Ripper, Kadavrik, Kamikaze Kings, Powerwolf, Ravian, Rotting Empire, Scornage, Skyclad, Sodom, Soulfly, Spectral, Superbutt, The Other, Truckfighters, Words of Farewell

2014
July 17–19: Annihilator, Arch Enemy, Ashes Of A Lifetime, Contradiction, Disquiet, Dystopera, Gloryful, Grailknights, Grave Digger, Hail of Bullets, Harasai, Iwrestledabearonce, Katalepsy, Maat, Milking The Goatmachine, Motorjesus, Negator, Pappe Of Destiny, Paragon, Satan, Scarab, Scarnival, Skiltron, Texas In July, The Crimson Ghosts, The Scalding, Torian, Vulture Industries

2015 
July 16–18 : Carcass, Eluveitie, Gamma Ray, Acyl, Beyond the Black, Butwetryit, Crossplane, Debauchery, Die apokalyptischen Reiter, Fiddlers Green, Gil Gamesh, Kissin' Dynamite, Sunchair, The Black Dahlia Murder, Torturized, Vogelfrey, War Kabinett, Wizard, Words of Farewell, Wulfpack, Excremetory Grindfuckers, Mantar, Miseo, The Prosecution, Insanity

2016 
July 14-16: Amorphis, Equilibrium, Testament, Another Problem, Apron, Bloodbath, Burden of Gried, Can of Worms, Craving, Delirious, Dust Bolt, Elvellon, Fleshgod Apocalypse, Gloryful, Hackneyed, Harpyie, Jesus Chrüsler Supercar, Kadavrik, Kryptos, Rage, Raven Woods, Skyclad, Suidakra, The Pokes.

2017 
In Extremo, Iced Earth, Elvenking, Darkest Horizon, God Dethroned, Ensiferum, HateSphere, Messiah's Kiss, Sisters of Suffocation, Vulture Industries, Words of Farewell, Aeverium, Atomgott, Contradiction, Dark Tranquillity, Fateful Finality, Misanthrope Monarch, Nervosa, War Kabinett, Copia, Crossplane, Gloryhammer, Lord Vigo, Memoriam, Munarheim, Spoil Engine, Storm Seeker.

2018 
Eluveitie, Exodus, Die Apokalyptischen Reiter, Korpiklaani, Moonspell, Motorjesus, Triddana, Night in Gales, Destruction, Scardust, Visigoth, Impureza, Infected Rain, Vogelfrey, Alvenrad, Betontod, Drone, Grailknights, Jinjer, Mantar, Skindred, The Monolith Deathcult, Torian.

2019 
July 11-13: Alestorm, Steel Panther, Kataklysm, Gloryhammer, Insomnium, Battle Beast, Dog Eat Dog, Septicflesh, Deserted Fear, Dust Bolt, Bloodywood, Wulfpäck, Craving, Hideous Divinity, Storm Seeker, Impureza, Silver Talon, Rising Insane, Deathcode Society, Silius, Blessed Hellride, Elvellon, AngelInc, Snakebite, The Crimson Ghosts, Victim, Solar Fragment, Source of Rage, Empyreal.

References

External links
Official website

Heavy metal festivals in Germany